The St. Stephen's Basilica or simply the Church of St. Stephen, also known by its French name, Saint-Étienne, is the name given to a Catholic church located outside the walls of the Old City of Jerusalem, on the road leading north to Nablus. It is next to the convent of St. Stephen, home to the French Bible and Archaeology School (École biblique et archéologique française de Jérusalem), and the convent church. An old tradition sees this place as the place where the martyrdom of Saint Stephen took place, the martyr deacon mentioned in the book of Acts. A rival site is located in the Kidron Valley.

History
The first time a sanctuary was built to commemorate the martyrdom was in the fifth century, when Empress Eudocia initiated the building of a structure on the site of the current basilica, a chapel dedicated to St. Stephen, where she was eventually buried. With the arrival of the Persians in 614 and the siege of Jerusalem that followed, the chapel was destroyed.

In 638, a small church was built by St. Sophronius, then restored and enlarged by the Crusaders, but later destroyed by themselves, lest they fall into the hands of Sultan Saladin.

In the nineteenth century the French Dominicans acquired the site of the ancient ruins of the Crusaders, and after archaeological excavations built the convent and the current basilica, which was consecrated in 1900.

See also
Catholic Church in Israel
Catholic Church in Palestine

References

External links
Photos of St Stephen's Basilica at the Manar al-Athar photo archive

Roman Catholic churches in Jerusalem
Buildings and structures in Jerusalem
Roman Catholic churches completed in 1900
Basilica churches in Jerusalem
École Biblique
20th-century Roman Catholic church buildings